Kenyon Lee "KJ" Martin Jr. (born January 6, 2001) is an American professional basketball player for the Houston Rockets of the National Basketball Association (NBA). He attended IMG Academy for his postgraduate year in Bradenton, Florida.

High school career
Kenyon Martin Jr attended Oaks Christian High School as a freshman but did not play basketball that year. Early in the school year, Kenyon Martin Jr was pulled out of Oaks Christian to be homeschooled. After his freshman year, he was enrolled in Chaminade College Preparatory where he started playing basketball as a sophomore.

A three-star recruit from Sierra Canyon School in Chatsworth, California, Martin played alongside Scotty Pippen Jr. and Cassius Stanley. Martin averaged 16.7 points and 9.8 rebounds per game for the back-to-back California Open Division champions.

Martin originally committed to play collegiately for Vanderbilt before opting for a postgraduate year at IMG Academy. 
He averaged 20 points and eight rebounds per game at IMG Academy, drawing praise for his athleticism. Martin scored 37 points at the National Prep Showcase and demonstrated an improved jump shot. Martin declared for the 2020 NBA draft on March 24, 2020.

Professional career

Houston Rockets (2020–present) 
On November 18, 2020, Martin was drafted by the Sacramento Kings with the 52nd overall pick in the 2020 NBA draft. On November 25, 2020, he was traded to the Houston Rockets in exchange for cash considerations and a future second-round pick. Martin signed a four-year contract with the Rockets on November 30. The Rockets organization put him on their G League affiliate team, the Rio Grande Valley Vipers.

Martin was activated by the Houston Rockets for the January 4, 2021, game against the Dallas Mavericks, then was inactive for one game before making his on-court NBA debut on January 8, 2021, vs. the Orlando Magic, scoring 7 points on 3-3 shooting (including a three-pointer)

On May 8, 2021, Martin scored a career-high 27 points against the Utah Jazz. He had a then-career high 10 rebounds in three different games, all in May 2021.

On November 25, 2022, Martin scored 21 points along with a career-high 15 rebounds in a 128–122 win against the Atlanta Hawks.

Career statistics

NBA

Regular season

|-
| style="text-align:left;"| 
| style="text-align:left;"| Houston
| 45 || 8 || 23.7 || .509 || .365 || .714 || 5.4 || 1.1 || .7 || .9 || 9.3
|-
| style="text-align:left;"| 
| style="text-align:left;"| Houston
| 79 || 2 || 21.0 || .533 || .357 || .634 || 3.8 || 1.3 || .4 || .5 || 8.8

Personal life
Martin is the son of Kenyon Martin, who was selected first overall in the 2000 NBA draft and played in the NBA for 15 years, and Heather Martin.

References

2001 births
Living people
African-American basketball players
American men's basketball players
Basketball players from Los Angeles
Houston Rockets players
IMG Academy alumni
Power forwards (basketball)
Rio Grande Valley Vipers players
Sacramento Kings draft picks
Sierra Canyon School alumni
21st-century African-American sportspeople